John Howell (17 June 1955 – 22 June 2006) was a British bobsledder. He competed in the two man and the four man events at the 1980 Winter Olympics.

References

1955 births
2006 deaths
British male bobsledders
Olympic bobsledders of Great Britain
Bobsledders at the 1980 Winter Olympics
Sportspeople from Stoke-on-Trent